Maria Ceres P. Doyo is a Filipino journalist, author, human rights activist, and feminist best known as a columnist and staff writer for the Philippine Daily Inquirer, for her numerous books on Philippine journalism, and for the historical impact of her investigative reports during the martial law under Ferdinand Marcos.

Martial law and journalism career beginnings 
Doyo had been a human rights activist before she became a journalist, but decided to cover the murder of Butbut Kalinga pangat (leader) Macli-ing Dulag after his leadership of the opposition to the Chico River Dam Project.  The publication of the work in the Manila Bulletin's Panorama magazine led to the firing of its then-editor Letty Jimenez Magsanoc and to Doyo herself being investigated by Marcos' armed forces. The incident proved to be a watershed moment in the mainstream press' coverage of Martial Law, with the media finally being able to publish reports critical of Marcos' authoritarian rule. The coverage earned Doyo her first major journalistic award, the Catholic Mass Media Awards trophy, given to her by Pope John Paul II during his visit to the Philippines in 1981.

Journalistic career
Beginning with the Chico River Dam Project story, Doyo's career as journalist has spanned four decades. She has written special reports and features, and she writes a popular regular column titled "Human Face" published in the Philippine Daily Inquirer.

Books 
 Journalist in Her Country : Articles, Essays & Photographs, 1980-1992
 Press Freedom under Siege : Reportage that Challenged the Marcos Dictatorship
 Macli-ing Dulag : Kalinga Chief, Defender of the Cordillera
 You Can't Interview God : Church Women and Men in the News : Selected Columns from the Philippine Daily Inquirer
 Bituin and the Big Flood
 Human Face : A Journalist's Encounters and Awakenings
 The Sisters Have Come a Long Way : A Look at the Lives of Women Religious in the Philippines

Awards 
Among the awards Doyo have won over the years include the Catholic Mass Media Award, the National Book Award, and the Jaime V. Ongpin Award.

See also 
 Letty Jimenez Magsanoc
 Macli-ing Dulag
 Chico River Dam Project

References 

Filipino journalists
Philippine Daily Inquirer people
Year of birth missing (living people)
Living people